Barefoot (translit. Yekhefim) is a 2011 Israeli TV miniseries created and directed by Ori Sivan.  It aired in 6 episodes on Israel's HOT 3 channel beginning in December 2011.

It is currently being made into a feature film by the same director.

Plot
The series is a sweeping historical drama that follows three generations of one family on a kibbutz.

Cast
Sivan Levy as Fanny
Karen Berger
Sarah Adler
Ohad Knoller
Muki [Daniel Niv]
Ofer Shechter
Marina Maximilian Blumin
Rose Feldman
Yehezkel Lazarov
Danielle Wircer
Shai Avivi
Alon Abutbul

References

External links

Israeli drama television series
Films about the kibbutz
2011 Israeli television series debuts